Al Bataineh or Batayneh (in Arabic البطاينة) is a surname, referring to one of the largest, most prominent, and respected tribes in Jordan of Shammar descent with wealthy businessmen. In English, it is written in different ways: Albataineh, Albatayneh, Al Bataineh, Al Batayneh, Al-Bataineh, Al-Batayneh, or Batainah.

They came to Jordan before 300 years, around the year 1700 and lived in irbid (north Jordan)  Irbid was called home of Albatayneh ( Arabic- ديرة البطين) due to Albataineh.

History
Al-Bateen is from the Shammar, which is a large, ancient Arab tribe whose roots extend to the belly of the Tayi tribe, including Zaid Al-Khail, Hatim Al-Ta'i , and Tay bin Ed bin Yashog bin Kahlan bin Saba, to whom the Arabs belong.  Its capital is Hail, and among it are famous princes such as the family of Ali and the family of Rashid, who succeeded in ruling, and it was that the area of influence of Shammar expanded until it reached the borders of Yemen and to the north to Hauran.

Al-Batayneh are from the Shammar tribe, descended from Sinjara Zawba زوبع , and their father is Al-Bateen. 

As for their first grandfather, he was Dirgham (ضرغام), who settled in the town of Arman in Jabal Al-Arab, where the Druze lived, and after that he died there, so his son, Sheikh Abdullah bin Issa bin Dergham Al-Bateen, his uncle Suleiman bin Dergham, and his brother Ibrahim bin Issa Al-Dergham, and their children, traveled to the south, where Ain Eil near Al-Mafraq, and then towards  The village of Jumaha, west of Kafryouba, and in Kafryouba, the village that belonged to the Ajloun Brigade, where Sheikh Abdullah Al-Bateen settled in Kafryouba كفريوبا, and was famous for his courage, generosity, hospitality, and good management. And he succeeded in winning over the Ottomans, who entrusted him with matters of collecting taxes and securing them to Damascus, as confirmed by the attached receipt dated 1766 from the Damascus Sharia Registry.

Surname
People with the surname include:

Alaa Batayneh (born 1969), Jordanian businessman and politician 
Mary Nazzal-Batayneh (born 1979), Palestinian Jordanian barrister

Surnames of Jordanian origin